Abraham is a surname. It can be of Jewish, English, French, German, Dutch, Irish, Welsh, Cornish, Breton, Lebanese, Syrian and other origins. It is derived from the Hebrew personal name Avraham, borne by the biblical patriarch Abraham, revered by Jews as a founding father of the Jewish people (Gen. 11-25), and by Muslims as founder of all Semitic peoples (see Abraham). The name is explained in Genesis 17:5 as being derived from the Hebrew av hamon goyim "father of a multitude of nations". It was commonly used as a given name among Christians in the Middle Ages, and has always been a popular Jewish given name. The English name Abram is often a short form of Abraham, but it can also be a shortened version of Adburgham, which comes from a place name. As an Irish name, it was adopted as an approximation (in sound, not meaning) of the Gaelic name Mac an Bhreitheamhan "son of the judge". The German name Brahm is often a short form of Abraham, but it can also be a topographic name signifying someone who lived near a bramble thicket (from the Middle High German brāme). The name Braham has been used as an Anglicization of both Abraham and its patronymic Abrahams by Ashkenazi Jews in the British Isles (see Braham). Abraham has also been used as an Anglicization of the equivalent Arabic surname Ibrāhīm (see Ibrahim).

List of people with the surname
Notable people with the surname include:

Abraham Abraham (1843–1911), American department store magnate
Abu Abraham (1924–2002), Indian cartoonist
Alan Abraham (1931–2020), Canadian politician
Andy Abraham (born 1964), English vocalist
Ann Abraham (born 1952), British ombudsman
Arthur Abraham (born 1980), German boxer
Avi Ben-Abraham, American scientist
Ben Abraham (born Henryk Nekrycz; 1924–2001), Polish-born Brazilian writer and historian
Ben Abraham (musician) (born 1985), Australian folk singer and songwriter
Brad Abraham (contemporary), Canadian-born screenwriter, author, journalist, producer, and comic book creator
Brian Abraham (born 1984), American professional baseball front-office executive and former coach
Caroline Abraham (1809–1877), New Zealand artist
Carolyn Abraham (born 1968), British-born Canadian freelance journalist and author
Charles Abraham (bishop of Derby) (1857–1945), second suffragan Bishop of Derby
Charles Abraham (bishop of Wellington) (1814–1903), first Anglican Bishop of Wellington, New Zealand
Clifton Abraham (born 1971), professional American football player
Damian Abraham (contemporary), punk rock singer and podcast host
Daniel Abraham (author) (born 1969), science fiction and fantasy author
Daniel Abraham (conductor) (born 1968), director of The Bach Sinfonia and choral activities at American University
Daniel Abraham (rugby league) (born 1981), Australian rugby league footballer
David Abraham (television executive) (born 1963), British television executive
David Abraham (footballer) (born 1986), Argentine association football player
Derek Abraham (born 1953), Dominica-born Canadian cricketer
Donnie Abraham (born 1973), American football coach and former player
Dustin Lee Abraham (contemporary), American actor
Edward Abraham (1913–1999), British biochemist
Emile Abraham (born 1974), Trinidad and Tobago cyclist
Erich Abraham (1895–1971), German infantry general
Erich Abraham (soldier) (1921–1943), German soldier, recipient of the Knight's Cross of the Iron Cross
Evan Abraham (1901–1990), Welsh footballer
F. Murray Abraham (born 1939), American actor
Farid F. Abraham (born 1937), American physicist
Farrah Abraham (born 1991), American reality television personality
Fred Abraham Sr. (1859–1901/18), British Guyanese cricketer
Fred Abraham Jr. (1886–1918), British Guyanese cricketer
Gareth Abraham (born 1969), Welsh association football player
George and Ashley Abraham (1871–1965) (1876–1951), British climbers and photographers
G. P. Abraham (1844–1923), British photographer, postcard publisher, and mountaineer
Henri Abraham (1868–1943), French physicist
Henry J. Abraham (1921–2020), American legal scholar
Henry David Abraham (born 1942), American psychiatrist, co-recipient of the 1985 Nobel Peace Prize
Hérard Abraham (born 1940), Haitian politician
Jay Abraham (born 1949), American business executive, conference speaker, and author
Jenő Ábrahám (1903–1973), Hungarian and Yugoslav football player
John Abraham (born 1972), Indian model and Bollywood actor
John Abraham (American football) (born 1978), American football player
John Abraham (director) (1937–1987), Indian film director
John Abraham (politician) (fl. 1672–1689), British governor
John Abraham (engineer), American engineering professor, climate science lecturer and debater
Jolly Abraham, Indian singer
Josef Abrhám (1939–2022), Czech film and theatre actor
Josh Abraham, American music producer
Karel Abraham (born 1990), Czech motorcycle racer
Karl Abraham (1877–1925), German psychoanalyst
K. A. Abraham (1942–2021), Indian cardiologist and medical writer
Knut Abraham (born 1966), German politician
Larry H. Abraham, (1939–2008), American author
Lucienne Abraham (1916–1970), French Trotskyist politician
Lynne Abraham (born 1941), American lawyer and judge
Malouf Abraham Jr. (born 1939), Texas physician and patron of the arts
Malouf Abraham Sr. (1915–1994), Texas businessman and politician
Marc Abraham, American film producer and director
Mark Abraham (born 1953), American politician
Max Abraham (1875–1922), German physicist
Max Abraham (publisher) (1831–1900), German music publisher
Michael Abraham (chemist) (contemporary), British chemist
Nahim Abraham (1885–1965), Lebanese-American businessman
Nicolas Abraham (1919–1975), Hungarian psychoanalyst
Patrick Abraham, American arrested on terrorism-related offenses
Paul Abraham (1892–1960), Serbian operetta composer
Pearl Abraham (born 1960), Israeli-American novelist, essayist and short story writer
Phil Abraham, American cinematographer and television director
Philip Abraham (1897–1955), Anglican Bishop of Newfoundland
Pierre Abraham (1892–1974), French journalist, essayist, and military figure in the French Air Force during the world wars
Pol Abraham (1891–1966), French architect
Raimund Abraham (1933–2010), Austrian architect and artist
Raju Abraham (born 1961), Indian politician
Ralph Abraham (mathematician) (born 1936), American mathematician and professor
Ralph Abraham (politician) (born 1954), American politician
Reji Abraham , Indian businessman
Robert Abraham (American football) (born 1960), professional American football player
Robert Abraham (architect) (1773–1850), London architect
Roberto Abraham (born 1965), Canadian astronomer and professor
Roman Abraham (1897–1976), Polish World War II general, son of Władysław Abraham
Ronny Abraham (born 1951), French judge
Samuel Abrahám (born 1960), Slovak academic administrator
S. Daniel Abraham (born 1924), American businessman
Segun Abraham (born 1953), Nigerian politician and businessman
Sheelu Abraham, Indian actress
Shiny Abraham (born 1965), Indian Olympic athlete
Spencer Abraham (born 1952), U.S. Senator from Michigan
Stephen Abraham, American lawyer and officer in the United States Army Reserve
Tajama Abraham (born 1975), American basketball player in the Women's National Basketball Association and coach
Tammy Abraham (born 1997), English professional footballer
Tancrède Abraham (1836–1895), French landscape painter and engraver
Thomas Abraham (cricketer) (1838–1873), English cricketer
Tom Abraham (1910–2007), Texas businessman and philanthropist
Tomáš Abrahám (born 1979), Czech football player
Walter Abraham (1923–2006), Australian architect and town planner
William Abraham (bishop) (1792–1837), Roman Catholic Bishop of Waterford and Lismore
William Abraham (Irish politician) (1840–1915), Irish Member of Parliament
William Abraham (British Army officer) (1897–1980), British Army officer
William Abraham (trade unionist) (1842–1922), Welsh politician
William Emmanuel Abraham (born 1934), Ghanaian philosopher
William J. Abraham (1947–2021), Irish theologian, analytic philosopher, and United Methodist pastor
William James Abraham (1883–1927), British trade unionist and politician, president of the National Union of Railwaymen (NUR)
Winston Abraham (born 1974), Australian rules football player
Władysław Abraham (1860–1941), Polish lawyer and academic, father of Roman Abraham
Wolfgang Abraham (1942–2013), German association football player
Filipos Abraham  Eritrean, Jewish, Ethiopian, Egyptian  
Xavier Abraham (born 1945), Catalan poet, cultural activist, and bookseller

See also
Abraham, the biblical patriarch
Abraham in Islam

References

Bibliography
Hanks, Patrick, Dictionary of American Family Names (2003), Oxford University Press, 
Hanks, Patrick and Flavia Hodges, Oxford Dictionary of Names, (1988), Oxford University Press, 

Jewish surnames